Hemmingford is a township municipality in south-west Quebec, founded in 1799. The population as of the Canada 2011 Census was 1,747. The township completely surrounds the Village of Hemmingford. The two entities (village and township) are locally referred to collectively as Hemmingford. The two share many things, such as the cost of the volunteer fire department, and both hold their councils and offices in the same building in the village.

History
After creation in 1855, the territory of the township was successively partitioned in 1857, 1863 and 1878 to form to the new municipalities of Franklin, Havelock and the Village of Hemmingford respectively.

Geography
The township of Hemmingford is located due south of Montreal in the Jardins-de-Napierville in the Montérégie region, in the south-east corner of the former Huntingdon County. It sits between what was the Seigniory of Beauharnois and Seigniory of Lacolle. Prior to its survey in 1792 and 1793, the Township was called "Waste lands". Since the mid 1800's Hemmingford has been known as being part of one of the main apple producing regions in Quebec.

The township borders the townships of Havelock, St-Chrysostome, St-Clotilde, Sherrington, and St-Bernard-de-Lacolle. Its southern border is the Canada–United States border with Clinton County, in New York State.

Hamlets
The following locations reside within the municipality's boundaries:
Barrington – a hamlet situated at the junction of Rte 219 and Fisher Road.
Hallerton – a hamlet situated on Williams Road.
The Fort – a hamlet located along Quebec Route 202 in the west towards Havelock

Demographics 

Attractions

Some of the local attractions include Parc Safari and Hemmingford Golf and Country Club. The town supports many commercial apple growers, as well as cideries and wineries which include; Cidrerie Du Minot, Domaine du Salamandre, le Chat Botté, Vignes des Bacchantes and Cidrerie C.E.Petch.

See also
List of township municipalities in Quebec
Village of Hemmingford
Hemingford, Nebraska

References

External links

 Chateauguay Valley
  Apples
 Hemmingford Village and Township website
 Parc Safari
 Hemmingford Golf and Country Club
 The Gleaner/La Source (local English/French newspaper)
 Epodunk Canada results for Hemmingford
Rootsweb South West Quebec 

Township municipalities in Quebec
Incorporated places in Les Jardins-de-Napierville Regional County Municipality